Mandaic lead rolls, sometimes also known as Mandaic amulets or sheets, which are related to Palestinian and Syrian metal amulets, are a specific term for a writing medium containing incantations in the Mandaic script incised onto lead sheets with a pin. Some Mandaic incantations are found on gold and silver sheets. They are rolled up and then inserted into a metal capsule with loops on it to be worn around the neck on a string or necklace.

History
These metal objects were produced by the Mandaeans, an ethnoreligious group, as protective talismans. Their inscribed texts are related to inscriptions written in ink on earthen ware bowls, the so-called Aramaic incantation bowls. The metal variants, however, can contain much longer texts and are often incribed on several lead sheets with catch-lines to indicate the continuation of the text onto the next sheet. The lead rolls date to Late Antiquity (3rd–5th centuries CE) with their textual forerunners going back to the Late Parthian period and originate from Iraq (Central and South Iraq) and Iran (Khuzistan). Major established sites of finds are al-Qurnah, Kish, Tulūl al-Bārūda/Coche, Ctesiphon, with the first to be discovered in graves 1853 by John George Taylor in Abu Shudhr north of the Shatt al-Arab and copied by Sir Henry Creswicke Rawlinson. It was followed nearly sixty years later by the publication of an exemplary specimen in 1909. Most of the objects came and still come through illicit antiquities trade.

Very specific for Mandaic lead rolls are magical stories created by learned Mandaean writers forming a new text genre for Aramaic (historiolas) which have a forerunner in the Aramaic Uruk incantation written in a very Late Babylonian cuneiform script (ca. 150 BC).

Such Mandaic magical texts often transmit insights on the afterlife and cults of Late Babylonian gods (Bēl, Birqa of Guzana, Nabû, Nerig/Nergal, Shamash, Sin), goddesses (Mulitta, Mammitu, Ishtar/Delibat = Δελεφατ), and deities of Iranian origin (Anahid, Danish/Danḥish, Ispandarmid = Spenta Armaiti) as well as demons (Lilith, Dew, Shedu). A recently translated lead amulet was bought in Jerusalem.

Literature 
 Francis Dietrich (1854). "The Inscription of Abushadhr", Appendix apud Christian C.J. Bunsen, Outlines of the Philosophy of Universal History, Applied to Language and Religion, 2. London, pp. 360-374, pl. 1.
 François Lenormant (1872). Essai sur la propagation de l’alphabet phénicien dans l’ancien monde. Paris.
 Mark Lidzbarski (1909). "Ein mandäisches Amulett," in Florilegium ou recueil de travaux d’érudition dédiés à Monsieur le Marquis Melchior de Vogüé. Paris, pp. 349–373.
 Franz Rosenthal (1939). "Das Mandäische," in Die aramaistische Forschung seit Th. Nöldeke’s Veröffentlichungen. Leiden, pp. 224–254.
 Rudolf Macuch (1967). "Altmandäische Bleirollen (Erster Teil)," in Franz Altheim and Ruth Stiehl (eds.), Die Araber in der Alten Welt, Vol. 4. Berlin, pp. 91–203.
 Rudolf Macuch (1968). "Altmandäische Bleirollen," in Franz Altheim and Ruth Stiehl (eds.), Die Araber in der Alten Welt, Vol. 5. Berlin, pp. 91–203.
 André Caquot (1972). "Un phylactère mandéen en plomb." Semitica 22: 67–87.
 Edmond Sollberger (1972). "Mr. Taylor in Chaldea." Anatolien Studies 22: 131–134.
 Joseph Naveh (1975). "Another Mandaic Lead Roll, in Israel Oriental Society 5: 47–53.
 Francesco Franco (1985). "A Mandaic Lead Fragment from Tell Baruda (Coche)." Mesopotamia 17: 147–150.
 Jonas C. Greenfield and Joseph Naveh (1985). "A Mandaic Lead Amulet with Four Incantations [Hebrew]." Eretz-Israel 18: 97-107, pls. 21–22.
 Christa Müller-Kessler (1996). "The Story of Bguzan-Lilit, Daughter of Zanay-Lilit." Journal of the American Oriental Society 116: 185–195.
 Christa Müller-Kessler (1998). "Aramäische Koine. Ein Beschwörungsformular aus Mesopotamien." Baghdader Mitteilungen 29: 331–348.
 Christa Müller-Kessler (1998). "A Mandaic Gold Amulet in the British Museum." Bulletin of the American Schools of Oriental Research 311: 83–88.
 Christa Müller-Kessler (1999). "Aramäische Beschwörungen und astronomische Omina in nachbabylonischer Zeit. Das Fortleben mesopotamischer Kultur im Vorderen Orient." In Johannes Renger (ed.). Babylon: Focus Mesopotamischer Geschichte, Wiege früher Gelehrsamkeit, Mythos in der Moderne (Colloquium der Deutschen Orient-Gesellschaft 2). Berlin, pp. 427-443. 
 Christa Müller-Kessler (1999). "Interrelations between Mandaic Lead Rolls and Incantation Bowls." In Tzvi Abusch and Karel van der Toorn (eds.). Mesopotamian Magic: Textual, Historical, and Interpretative Perspectives (Ancient Magic and Divination 1) Groningen, pp. 197-209. 
 Christa Müller-Kessler and Karlheinz Kessler (1999). "Spätbabylonische Gottheiten in spätantiken mandäischen Texten." Zeitschrift für Assyriologie 89: 65-87.
 Christa Müller-Kessler (1999). "Dämon + YTB ‘L — Ein Krankheitsdämon. Eine Studie zu aramäischen Beschwörungen medizinischen Inhalts." In Barbara Böck, Eva Cancik-Kirschbaum, Thomas Richter (eds.). Munuscula Mesopotamica. Festschrift für Johannes Renger (Alter Orient und Altes Testament 267) Münster, pp. 341–354. 
 Christa Müller-Kessler (2000). "Dan(ḥ)iš – Gott und Dämon." In Joachim Marzahn and Hans Neumann (eds.). Assyriologica et Semitica. Festschrift für Joachim Oelsner anläßlich seines 65. Geburtstages (Alter Orient und Altes Testament 252) Münster, pp. 311–318. 
 Christa Müller-Kessler (2000/01). "Phraseology in Mandaic Incantations and its Rendering in Various Eastern Aramaic Dialects: A Collection of Magic Terminology. Aram 11/12:  293-310.
 Christa Müller-Kessler (2001/02). "Die Zauberschalensammlung des British Museum." Archiv für Orientforschung 48/49: 115–145.
 Christa Müller-Kessler (2001). "Lilit(s) in der aramäisch-magischen Literatur der Spätantike." Altorientalische Forschungen 28: 338–352.
 Christa Müller-Kessler (2002). "Die aramäische Beschwörung und ihre Rezeption in den mandäisch-magischen Texten am Beispiel ausgewählter aramäischer Beschwörungsformulare." In Rika Gyselen (ed.). Charmes et sortilèges, magie et magiciens (Res Orientales XIV). Louvain, pp. 193-208. 
 Christa Müller-Kessler (2002). "A Charm against Demons of Time." In Cornelia Wunsch (ed.). Mining the Archives: Festschrift Christopher Walker on the Occasion of his 60th Birthday (Babylonische Archive 1). Dresden, pp. 183–189. 
 Christa Müller-Kessler (2002). "Jüdische und gnostische Beschwörungen medizinischen Inhalts aus der Spätantike des Ostens." In Axel Karenberg und Christian Leitz (eds.). Heilkunde und Hochkultur II. “Magie und Medizin” und “Der alte Mensch” in den antiken Zivilisationen des Mittelmeerraumes (Naturwissenschaft – Philosophie – Geschichte 16). Münster, pp. 183–208. 
 Christa Müller-Kessler (2004). "The Mandaeans and the Question of Their Origin." ARAM 16: 47–60.
 Karlheinz Kessler (2008). "Das wahre Ende Babyloniens — Die Tradition der Aramäer, Mandäer, Juden und Manichäer." In Joachim Marzahn and Günther Schauerte (eds.). Babylon. Mythos und Wahrheit. München, pp. 467–486. 
 Christa Müller-Kessler (2010). "A Mandaic Lead Roll in the Collection of the Kelsey Museum, Michigan: Fighting the Evil Entities of Death." ARAM 22: 477–493.
 Christa Müller-Kessler (2012). "More on Puzzling Words and Spellings in Aramaic Magic Bowls and Related Texts." Bulletin of the School of Oriental and African Studies 75: 1-31.
 Christa Müller-Kessler (2017). "Zauberschalen und ihre Umwelt. Ein Überblick über das Schreibmedium Zauberschale. In Jens Kamran, Rolf Schäfer, Markus Witte (eds.). Zauber und Magie im antiken Palästina und in seiner Umwelt (Abhandlungen des Deutschen Palästina-Vereins 46) Wiesbaden, pp. 59–94, pls. 1–8. 
 Christa Müller-Kessler (2018). "Šamaš, Sîn (Sahra, Sira), Delibat (Ištar, al-‘Uzzā), und Kēwān (Kajjamānu) in den frühen mandäischen magischen Texten und bei ihren Nachbarn. Eine Bestandsaufnahme." ISIMU 20/21: 259–295.

See also 
 Incantation bowl
 List of Mandaean texts
 Demons in Mandaeism

References

External links 
British Museum collection of Mandaic lead rolls

Amulets
Necklaces
Magic items
Objects believed to protect from evil
Mandaean texts
Lead objects

Medieval Iraq